Thomas Keith (c. 1793 - 1815) was a Scottish soldier, captured in Egypt while fighting for the United Kingdom. As a prisoner of war, he converted to Islam and joined the Ottoman military. He died in 1815 as governor of Medina while fighting the rising power of the Saudi dynasty.

Born in Edinburgh, Keith enlisted in the 78th (Highlanders) Regiment of Foot on 4 August  1804. He went with the 2nd battalion of the regiment to join John Stuart in the British campaign to Sicily  1806. Soon after, Keith was sent as part of the Alexandria expedition of 1807. 

After being captured at  Al Hamed near Rosetta on 21 April 1807, Keith and a drummer in his regiment, William Thompson, were purchased by Ahmad Aga (nicknamed Ahmad Bonaparte).  During the time the two Scots resolved to convert to Islam and change their names: Keith becoming Ibrahim Aga and  Thompson Osman.  Keith had a quarrel with one of Ahmad's Mamluks, ironically a Sicilian. The Sicilian was killed in their duel and the Scot then sought the  aid of the wife of Muhammad Ali Pasha, wali of Egypt.  She sent Keith to the service of her son Tusun Pasha.  In 1811, Keith joined Tusun's expedition against the Wahhabis of Arabia. After a successful campaign, Keith was made acting governor of Medina in 1815 in Tusun's absence. He was killed in a Wahhabi ambush later that year.

Thomas Keith is the subject of the novel Blood and Sand (1987) by Rosemary Sutcliff.

References

Scottish soldiers
1815 deaths
Military personnel from Edinburgh
British Muslims
Converts to Islam
British Army personnel of the Napoleonic Wars
Ottoman people of the Wahhabi War
1790s births
British Army soldiers
British emigrants to the Ottoman Empire
Ottoman military personnel killed in action